Mark Langhorn Coombs (born April 1960) is a British billionaire businessman, CEO of the Ashmore Group.

Early life
Mark Langhorn Coombs was born in April 1960, and was educated at Dulwich College and St John's College, Cambridge with a degree in law.

Career
Coombs' first career job was in 1983 in the Latin American department at Grindlays Bank, which was later acquired by the Australia and New Zealand Banking Group. In 1998, he started Ashmore as a new division of the company. In 1999, Coombs led a management buyout, and took Ashmore public in 2006. He later bought the money manager Emerging Market Management. In 2007, he held 42.5% of the Ashmore Group.

In 2019, Coombs disposed of 10 million shares in Ashmore Group, which earned him £43.5 million.

According to the Sunday Times Rich List in 2020, Coombs is worth £1.42 billion, a decrease of £88 million from 2019.

Personal life
He lives with his wife Rebecca in Wimbledon, London.

References

1960 births
Living people
British billionaires
British chief executives
People educated at Dulwich College
Alumni of St John's College, Cambridge
Conservative Party (UK) donors